Andrei Veis (born 6 April 1990) is an Estonian retired international footballer who played as a defender and a midfielder.

Career
Veis has played club football for Paide Linnameeskond, Warrior Valga, Flora II Tallinn, Viljandi Tulevik and Flora Tallinn.

On 9 February 2012, JK Sillamäe Kalev announced that he had signed a contract with the club, alongside three other players.

He made his international debut for Estonia in 2011.

References

External links
 
 

1990 births
Living people
Estonian footballers
Estonia international footballers
Paide Linnameeskond players
JK Sillamäe Kalev players
Viljandi JK Tulevik players
FC Flora players
Association football defenders
Association football midfielders
FC Viljandi players